Zhujiang New Town Automated People Mover System, or APM line, is an automated people mover (APM) system mainly serving the Zhujiang New Town area in Guangzhou, the new CBD of the city. All of its stations are underground. In terms of construction cost per kilometre, it is the most expensive people mover system in the world, yet it is the shortest and least used line in the Guangzhou Metro network. This was due to the two stations being located close to the opening ceremony venue.

Opening timeline

Lengths and stations

Stations

Operating hours
The system was designed to provide service from 6:00 to 24:00 every day, and may run extra hours on special occasions, such as weekends, holidays or when major events are being held. But due to the low demand, trains operated from 8:00 to 20:00 when the line first opened. The service hours have since been gradually extended and from 4 October 2014 trains have been operating between 7:00 and 23:30.

Rolling stock

The APM uses 14 Bombardier Transportation's APM 100 cars built in Pittsburgh, Pennsylvania.

References

Guangzhou Metro
Rubber-tyred metros
Urban people mover systems
People mover systems in China
Railway lines opened in 2010
2010 establishments in China